General elections were held in Japan on 15 May 1908. The result was a victory for the Rikken Seiyūkai party, which won 187 of the 379 seats.

Electoral system
The 379 members of the House of Representatives were elected in 51 multi-member constituencies based on prefectures and cities. Voting was restricted to men aged over 25 who paid at least 10 yen a year in direct taxation.

Campaign
A total of 900 candidates contested the 379 seats.

Results

Notes

References

General elections in Japan
Japan
General election
Japanese general election
Election and referendum articles with incomplete results